The F Independência (F-44) is a Niterói-class frigate of the Brazilian Navy. The Independência was the fifth ship of her class ordered by the Brazilian Navy, on 20 September 1970. The Independência was launched on 2 September 1974, and was commissioned on 3 September 1979.

History
The Independência took over command of the Maritime Task Force of the United Nations Interim Force in Lebanon (FTM-UNIFIL) on 28 January 2018, to carry out Operation Lebanon XIII from March to September 2018. The ship will captain the FTM-UNIFIL, whose mission is to prevent entry into Lebanese territory, illegal arms and smuggling, as well as providing support for the development of the Lebanese Navy, in terms of training its personnel, in order to make it capable of controlling its territorial waters in the future.

Gallery

External links 

 MarineTraffic

References

Niteroi-class frigates
1974 ships
Ships built in Southampton
Frigates of the Cold War